Natalie (Talia) Jomini Stroud is the E. M. Dealey professor at the University of Texas at Austin. She is known for her work examining the intersection between media and democracy.

Education and career 
She received her Ph.D from the Annenberg School for Communication at the University of Pennsylvania. As of 2022 she is the E. M. “Ted” Dealey professor in the Department of Communication Studies and the School of Journalism at the University of Texas at Austin.

In 2012, her book Niche News: The Politics of News Choice won the International Communication Association Outstanding Book Award.

In 2021 she was named a Fellow of the International Communication Association, and is a fellow of the Annenberg Public Policy Center.

She has worked with Eli Pariser on projects including Civic Signals and New Public, and spoken about how trust in the media aligns with political interests.

Selected publications

References 

Living people
Year of birth missing (living people)
University of Pennsylvania alumni

University of Texas at Austin faculty